Cygnet may refer to several ships :
  with which George Strickland Kingston arrived in South Australia in 1836
 a privateer ship captained by Charles Swan (?–1690) and with which William Dampier explored the coastline of Western Australia in 1688 and 1699
 Cygnet 44, a yacht model by Caribbean Sailing Yachts
 , a ship operating for Furness Railway
 , the name of sixteen ships of the Royal Navy

Ship names